Progressive Christianity represents a postmodern theological approach, and is not necessarily synonymous with progressive politics. It developed out of the liberal Christianity of the modern era, which was rooted in the Enlightenment's thinking. Progressive Christianity is a postliberal theological movement within Christianity that, in the words of Reverend Roger Wolsey, "seeks to reform the faith via the insights of post-modernism and a reclaiming of the truth beyond the verifiable historicity and factuality of the passages in the Bible by affirming the truths within the stories that may not have actually happened."

Progressive Christianity, as described by its adherents, is characterized by a willingness to question tradition, acceptance of human diversity, a strong emphasis on social justice and care for the poor and the oppressed, and environmental stewardship of the earth. Progressive Christians have a deep belief in the centrality of the instruction to "love one another" (John 15:17) within the teachings of Jesus Christ.

Progressive Christianity focuses on promoting values such as compassion, justice, mercy, and tolerance, often through political activism. Though prominent, the movement is by no means the only significant movement of progressive thought among Christians. It draws influence from multiple theological streams, including evangelicalism, liberal Christianity, neo-orthodoxy, pragmatism, postmodern theology, progressive Christian reconstructionism, and liberation theology. The concerns of feminism are also a major influence on the movement, as expressed in feminist and womanist theologies. Although progressive Christianity and liberal Christianity are often used synonymously, the two movements are distinct, despite much overlap.

Origins
A priority of justice and care for the down-trodden are a recurrent theme in the Hebrew prophetic tradition inherited by Christianity.  This has been reflected in many later Christian traditions of service and ministry, and more recently in the United States of America through Christian involvement in political trends such as the Progressive Movement and the Social Gospel.

Throughout the 20th century, a strand of progressive or liberal Christian thought outlined the values of a 'good society'. It stresses fairness, justice, responsibility, and compassion, and condemns the forms of governance that wage unjust war, rely on corruption for continued power, deprive the poor of facilities, or exclude particular racial or sexual groups from fair participation in national liberties. It was influential in the US mainline churches, and reflected global trends in student activism. It contributed to the ecumenical movement, as represented internationally by the World Student Christian Federation and the World Council of Churches internationally, and at the national level through groups such as the National Council of Churches in the US and Australian Student Christian Movement.

Contemporary movement
The ascendancy of evangelicalism in the US, particularly in its more socially conservative forms, challenged many people in mainline churches. Recently, a focus for those who wish to challenge this ascendancy has been provided by Jim Wallis of Sojourners, who described himself as a progressive evangelical Christian, although Sojourners has rejected advertisements urging mainline churches to welcome gay members.  This has enabled many Christians who are uncomfortable with conservative evangelicalism to identify themselves explicitly as "Progressive Christians". At the onset of this new movement to organize Progressive Christians, the single largest force holding together was a webring, The Progressive Christian Bloggers Network, and supporters frequently find and contact each other through dozens of online chat-rooms.

Notable initiatives within the movement for progressive Christianity include the Center for Progressive Christianity (TCPC) in Cambridge, Massachusetts, The Beatitudes Society, the campaigning organization CrossLeft, the technology working group Social Redemption and The Progressive Episcopal Church (TPEC).

CrossLeft joined with Every Voice Network and Claiming the Blessing in October 2005 to stage a major conference, Path to Action, at the National Cathedral in Washington, DC. Among the speakers were E. J. Dionne, Richard Parker, Jim Wallis, Senator Danforth, and David Hollinger.

In the United Kingdom, the movement is represented by the Progressive Christianity Network Britain. Notable related UK organisations include the Center for Radical Christianity at St Marks, Sheffield, and the UK-based Sea of Faith network.

Examples of statements of contemporary Progressive Christian beliefs include:
 the Eight Points produced by TCPC: a statement of agreement about Christianity as a basis for tolerance and human rights;
 the Phoenix Affirmations produced by Crosswalk (Phoenix, AZ) - include twelve points defining Christian love of God, Christian love of neighbor, and Christian love of self.
 the article, "Grassroots Progressive Christianity: A Quiet Revolution" by Hal Taussig published in The Fourth R, May–June 2006.
 the working definition utilized in Roger Wolsey's book Kissing Fish: Christianity for People Who Don't Like Christianity:

As Wolsey mentions, Progressive Christianity "leans toward panentheism rather than supernatural theism..." The role of panentheism in Progressive Christianity shifts the emphasis from belief to contemplative practice and experiential faith. So Progressive Christianity is often characterized by contemplative or meditative forms of worship. This finds perhaps its most poignant expression in Finding God in the Body: A Spiritual Path for the Modern West by Benjamin Riggs:

Compared to traditional Christianity
According to Archbishop Wynn Wagner of the former North American Old Catholic Church, holding to the ideals of progressive Christianity sets the movement apart from traditional Christianity.  Inclusiveness and acceptance is the basic posture of progressive Christianity.

Seventh-day Adventism

Within the Seventh-day Adventist Church, the liberal wing describe themselves as "progressive Adventists". They disagree with some of the traditional teachings of the church. While most are still of evangelical persuasion, a minority are liberal Christians.

Environmental ministries
As Bruce Sanguin writes, "It's time for the Christian church to get with a cosmological program (...). We now know, for instance, that we live in an evolving or evolutionary universe. Evolution is the way that the Holy creates in space and in time, in every sphere: material, biological, social, cultural, psychological, and spiritual. This new cosmology simply cannot be contained by old models and images of God, or by old ways of being the church."

Central to this recovery of awe in the cosmos is the epic of evolution, the 14-billion-year history of the universe. Scientists (Edward O. Wilson, Brian Swimme, Eric Chaisson, Ursula Goodenough and others) initiated this story which has been perpetuated with a religion component by some liberal theologians (Gordon D. Kaufman, Jerome A. Stone, Michael Dowd, etc.).

Evolutionary evangelist and progressive minister Michael Dowd uses the term Epic of Evolution or Great Story to help construct his viewpoint of evolution theology. His position is that science and religious faith are not mutually exclusive (a form of religious naturalism). He preaches that the epic of cosmic, biological, and human evolution, revealed by science, is a basis for an inspiring and meaningful view of our place in the universe and a new approach to religion. Evolution is viewed as a religious spiritual process that is not meaningless blind chance.

Criticism
Geoff Thompson argues that the rhetoric of Progressive Christianity, as represented by Gretta Vosper and John Shelby Spong, "often over-reaches its arguments." In particular, he concludes that "[i]t is very difficult to see how what [Vosper] proposes needs any church or even the minimalist, idiosyncratic definition of Christianity which she offers.

John MacArthur has identified a lack of crucicentrism and Christocentricism, and its affinity to old liberalism in its treatment and low view of biblical authority, supernaturalism and inspiration.

See also

 Catholic Worker Movement
 Christian anarchism
 Christian existentialism
 Christian feminism
 Christian humanism
 Christian left
 Christian socialism
 Christian Universalism
 Christian views on poverty and wealth
 Christianity and homosexuality
 Christianity and politics
 Egalitarianism
 Emerging church
 Engaged Spirituality
 Evangelical left
 Free Christians (Britain)
 Fundamentalist–Modernist controversy
 Historical-critical method
 LGBT-affirming Christian denominations
 Living the Questions, curriculum resources for Progressive Christians
 Mainline Protestant
 Modernism (Roman Catholicism)
 National Union for Social Justice
 Patheos
 Peace churches
 Political theology
 Postmillennialism
 Postmodern Christianity
 The Progressive Christian, magazine published from 1823 to 2011
 Red Letter Christians
 Religious pluralism
 Rerum novarum
 Secular humanism
 Secular religion
 Social justice and injustice
 Queer theology
 Unitarianism
 Women's ordination

References

Christian philosophy
Christian movements
Christian terminology